This is a list of works by the English phonetician Lilias Armstrong. It also contains references to contemporary reviews of her books.

Works by Armstrong

Books

An English Phonetic Reader

Reviews:

A Burmese Phonetic Reader
 

Reviews:
 
 
Response:

Handbook of English Intonation
 

Reviews:

The Phonetics of French
 

Foreword by Daniel Jones.

Reviews:
 
 
 
Response:

"The Phonetic Structure of Somali"
 [Reprinted. Farnborough: Gregg. 1964. . Archived from the original on 18 October 2017.]

Reviews:

Studies in French Intonation

Reviews:

The Phonetic and Tonal Structure of Kikuyu
  [Reprinted. London: Routledge. 2018. ]

Preface by Daniel Jones.

Reviews:

Papers and chapters
 
 Review:

Specimens
 
Pronunciation: Fröken Gyllander of Stockholm
Text: "The Honest Woodcutter"
 
Text: "May Night, or the Drowned Maiden" by N. V. Gogol
 
Pronunciation: Bien-ming Chiu of Amoy
Text: "The North Wind and the Sun"
()
 
Text: "The North Wind and the Sun"
  [Supplement to Le Maître Phonétique. 3rd Ser. 43. July–September 1933.]
Text: "The North Wind and the Sun"
()
Reprinted in: 
 
Pronunciation: Haji Farah of Berbera
Text: "The North Wind and the Sun"

Book reviews

Transcription passages for students

Discography

Notes

Explanatory notes

Citations

References

 

 
 
 
 
 
 
 
 
 

Bibliographies by writer
Bibliographies of English writers